Momir Bakrač (born 1957 in Nikšić) is a former Yugoslav football payer, from the 1970s and 1980s.

Bakrač was known for playing for several Yugoslav football clubs. He has a younger brother named Miomir who was also football player.

External links 
 Apparition of Montenegrins in Medjogorje 
 HNK Hajduk Split

1957 births
Living people
Footballers from Nikšić
Association football midfielders
Montenegrin footballers
Yugoslav footballers
FK Sutjeska Nikšić players
FK Budućnost Podgorica players
HNK Hajduk Split players
Brescia Calcio players
Yugoslav expatriate footballers
Expatriate footballers in Italy
Yugoslav expatriate sportspeople in Italy